Euphaedra mirabilis is a butterfly in the family Nymphalidae. It is found from Nigeria to the Democratic Republic of the Congo and its eastern range limit of Uganda.

Description
Very close to Euphaedra xypete qv.

Subspecies
Euphaedra mirabilis mirabilis (Nigeria to the Democratic Republic of the Congo)
Euphaedra mirabilis lurida Hecq, 1997 (Democratic Republic of the Congo)
Euphaedra mirabilis nubila Hecq, 1986 (Democratic Republic of the Congo: Uele and Kivu, Uganda: Semuliki National Park)

References

Butterflies described in 1980
mirabilis